Mount Chetwynd is a mountain, over  high, immediately south of Mount Gauss in the Kirkwood Range of Victoria Land. It was discovered by the British National Antarctic Expedition, 1901–04, and named for Sir Peter Chetwynd, a naval friend of Scott's, who was later Superintendent of Compasses at the Admiralty.

References
 
 Mount Chetwynd on AAD website

Mountains of Victoria Land
Scott Coast